"Silver Springs" is a song written by Stevie Nicks and performed by British-American band Fleetwood Mac. It was originally intended for the band's 1977 album Rumours, but became a B-side to the song "Go Your Own Way". A live version was released as a single from the 1997 album The Dance; this version of the song was nominated for the Grammy Award for Best Pop Performance by a Duo or Group with Vocals in 1998.

History
Written by Stevie Nicks, "Silver Springs" was intended for the album Rumours. Years after the fact, Nicks commented that the song's exclusion from the album marked a growing tension in the band. The track describes Nicks's perspective on the ending of the romantic relationship between her and the lead guitarist, Lindsey Buckingham. She has said,
I wrote "Silver Springs" about Lindsey. And we were in Maryland somewhere driving under a freeway sign that said Silver Springs (sic), Maryland. And I loved the name...Silver Springs sounded like a pretty fabulous place to me. And 'You could be my silver springs', that's just a whole symbolic thing of what you could have been to me.

According to Rolling Stone, "Nicks' tender yet vengeful post-mortem on her breakup with Buckingham [became] an emotional lightning rod. The song would have behind-the-scenes repercussions for decades to come – nearly leading to the breakup of the band." For multiple reasons, including its length and relatively slower tempo, the song was excluded from the Rumours album despite strenuous and repeated objections from Nicks. In a 1997 documentary on the making of Rumours, Richard Dashut, the engineer and co-producer, called it "the best song that never made it to a record album". The song was, however, released in late 1976 as the B-side of the "Go Your Own Way" single, a Buckingham-written song about the couple's breakup.

Years later, the band went on a world tour to promote the Fleetwood Mac album Behind the Mask. After the tour concluded, Nicks left the group over a dispute with Mick Fleetwood, who would not allow her to release "Silver Springs" on her 1991 album Timespace – The Best of Stevie Nicks because of his plans to release it on a forthcoming Fleetwood Mac box set. The song did appear in the 1992 box set 25 Years – The Chain.

When the remastered edition of Rumours was released in 2004, "Silver Springs" was included (as a previously unreleased, slightly longer version of 4:47) between "Songbird" and "The Chain". The song also appeared on Nicks' compilation album Crystal Visions - The Very Best of Stevie Nicks. She wrote in the album's liner notes that the song was intended as a gift for her mother, who later referred to it as her "rainy day song", and that the exclusion of the song from Rumours was a source of anger for many years.

Live version
In 1997, "Silver Springs" got a second life on the reunion album The Dance. During the filming of the reunion concert that reunited Nicks and Buckingham, the track was on the set list. Nicks said "the fiery take on the song that appears in The Dance was 'for posterity...I wanted people to stand back and really watch and understand what [the relationship with Lindsey] was.'" The Dance was recorded across three performances at Warner Brothers Studios in June 1997. "I never thought that 'Silver Springs' would ever be performed onstage [again]," Nicks reflected during a 1997 MTV interview. "My beautiful song just disappeared [20 years ago]. For it to come back around like this has really been special to me".

The live version of "Silver Springs" was released as a radio single in the United States on 22 July 1997, and it was issued in Germany physically the same year. This version appeared on several music charts, including the US Billboard Hot 100 Airplay chart (number 41), the Canadian RPM Top Singles chart (number 38), and the Dutch Single Top 100 (number 96). In 1998, the track was nominated for a Grammy Award for Best Pop Performance by a Duo or Group with Vocals.

Personnel
 Stevie Nicks – vocals
 Lindsey Buckingham – guitar, harmonies
 Christine McVie – keyboards, piano, harmonies
 John McVie – bass guitar
 Mick Fleetwood – drums, percussion

Charts

Weekly charts

Year-end charts

References

1976 songs
1997 singles
Fleetwood Mac songs
Reprise Records singles
Silver Spring, Maryland
Songs written by Stevie Nicks
Warner Records singles